The 2019–20 Goa Professional League is the 22nd season of the Goa Professional League, the top football league in the Indian state of Goa, since its establishment 1996. The league season began on 1 October 2019. SESA Football Academy was promoted to the premier division and they replaced FC Bardez, who were relegated at the end of the previous campaign. The league matches were played at the Duler Stadium and Navelim Football Ground.

Sporting Clube de Goa and Churchill Brothers were declared joint winners of GPL as the 13 remaining games could not be played due to the COVID-19 pandemic and the remaining teams wouldn't have topped the league even if they had played.

Teams

Managers and foreign players

Standings

Matches

Round 1

Round 2

Round 3

Round 4

Round 5

Round 6

Round 7

Round 8

Top scorers

Source

References

Goa Professional League seasons